Jan Kohout (born 29 March 1961) is a Czech diplomat and politician. He was Minister of Foreign Affairs of the Czech Republic in caretaker governments of Jan Fischer and Jiří Rusnok. Between 1986–1989 he had been a member of the Communist Party of Czechoslovakia; since 1995 is a member of the Social Democratic Party but before accepting the office of Foreign Minister he suspended party membership.

After the Velvet revolution, he entered the Czechoslovak and later Czech Ministry of Foreign Affairs. He served as Ambassador to the EU in Brussels as well as Deputy Foreign Minister. After Prime Minister Vladimír Špidla resigned in 2004, Kohout was offered the post but refused; Stanislav Gross took over as Premier.

Kohout is a graduate of the Faculty of Arts of the Charles University in Prague. He is divorced and has two children.

References

External links
 Official biography

|-

1961 births
Czech diplomats
Foreign Ministers of the Czech Republic
Politicians from Plzeň
Living people
Czech Social Democratic Party Government ministers
Charles University alumni
Communist Party of Czechoslovakia members